Hovea pedunculata, is a species of flowering plant in the family Fabaceae. It is an small shrub with mauve flowers, dark green leaves and rusty coloured new growth. It grows in Queensland and New South Wales.

Description
Flowering occurs from August to September and the fruit is a pod somewhat densely covered with hairs.

Taxonomy and naming
Hovea pedunculata was first formally described in 2001 by Ian R. Thompson and James Henderson Ross and the description was published in Australian Systematic Botany. The specific epithet (pedunculata) means "pedunculate".

Distribution and habitat
This hovea grows in dry forests or woodland usually on granite in the Gibraltar Range, near Wauchope and in Queensland.

References

pedunculata
Flora of Queensland
Flora of New South Wales
Fabales of Australia